

Biography 
Lt Gen. Thomas Cirillo Swaka  (born Thomas Cirillo Swaka) is a south Sudanese politician and  the leader and Commander in Chief of the National Salvation Front-NSF a rebel group opposing the government of the Republic of South Sudan.

Lt Gen. Thomas Cirillo Swaka is born to the Bari Group  and he is the lieutenant general of the National Salvation Front-NSF. South Sudan's government and the rebels of the National Salvation Front (NSF) announced in Rome the signing of a ceasefire agreement which to this point has yielded no positive outcome for the Country since the 2015 Civil war.

Work Background 
Lt Gen. Thomas Cirillo is a south Sudanese politician and Lt General from the south Sudan People's Defence Forces (SSPDF) and was the ex- deputy general chief of staffs for logistics and training and is he the founder and current opposition leader for the south Sudan's Nation Salvation Front (NAS)

References 

Living people
South Sudanese military personnel
Year of birth missing (living people)